Astwood is a surname. Notable people with the surname include:

Cynthia Astwood (born 1946), British diplomat
Edwin Astwood (born 1973), Turks and Caicos Islands politician
Edwin B. Astwood (1909–1976), Bermudian-American physiologist and endocrinologist
Glenn Astwood, (born 1954), Bermudian sailor
Jeffrey Carlton Astwood (1907−1997), Bermudian politician
Jeffrey Christopher Astwood (born 1933), Bermudian politician
Norma Cox Astwood, Bermudian psychologist
Stephen Astwood (born 1981), Bermudian football player
William Marischal Astwood, Bermudian politician